Dichromodes consignata is a moth of the  family Geometridae. It is found in Australia.They are grayish brown with brown hindwings. They have wavy submarginal lines on each forewing. With their wings measuring 3 cm. Females have thread-like antenna while males have a feather-like fringe on one side.

References

Oenochrominae
Moths described in 1861